Egidio Raúl Arévalo Ríos (January 1, 1982), nicknamed El Cacha, is a Uruguayan professional footballer who plays as a defensive midfielder for Primera División club Sacachispas. He also holds Mexican citizenship.

Club career
Nicknamed El Cacha and occasionally referred to as El pequeño gigante, is a product of the Paysandú Bella Vista youth team. Arévalo has played for Paysandú Bella Vista, Bella Vista (Montevideo), Peñarol, Monterrey, Danubio, San Luis, Botafogo and Club Tijuana.

On July 23, 2012, after weeks of speculation, it was announced he had signed a three-year contract with Serie A club Palermo. On August 9, 2013 Arévalo was loaned to Chicago Fire for the remainder of the 2013 MLS season. On August 14, 2013 Chicago Fire announced they signed Arévalo Ríos outright. He was not retained following the season.

In December 2013, Arévalo was reportedly bought by Mexican outfit Tigres UANL, and was loaned to Monarcas Morelia for six months. In April 2014 it was revealed that Tijuana still owned the Arévalo's rights when Tigres stated they were in negotiations with Tijuana to acquire the player, the following month it was announced that Tigres signed Arévalo. Two days after his participation with the Uruguay national team on the 2014 FIFA World Cup ended, he started training immediately with Tigres, what coach Ricardo Ferretti praised and said that Arévalo is "not an idol, but an example of what a player must be". On July 9, 2014, Arévalo made his official debut with Tigres against former team Monarcas Morelia for the 2014 Supercopa MX.  Arévalo was a key player in the UANL squad that achieved the finals of the 2015 Copa Libertadores. Also, he was part of the team that won the Apertura 2015 season championship. In December 2015, after the Apertura 2015 championship with Tigres, it was announced that Arévalo would be joining Atlas on loan for 6 months without a buying option. In mid-2016, he was transferred to Chiapas. In December 2016, he transferred again, to Veracruz.

International career

Arévalo played all of the games at the 2010 FIFA World Cup and the 2014 FIFA World Cup. In 2011, he won the Copa América in Argentina. He was chosen by Óscar Tabárez as one of the three over aged players for the London 2012 Olympics Uruguayan squad. He was chosen captain of the national team.

Career statistics

International
{| class="wikitable" style="text-align:center"
! colspan=3 | Uruguay
|-
!Year!!Apps!!Goals
|-
| 2006
| 1
| 0
|-
| 2007
| 3
| 0
|-
| 2010
| 11
| 0
|-
| 2011
| 15
| 0
|-
| 2012
| 9
| 0
|-
| 2013
| 13
| 0
|-
| 2014
| 13
| 0
|-
| 2015
| 10
| 0
|-
| 2016
| 12
| 0
|-
| 2017
| 3
| 0
|-
! Total
! 90
! 0

Honours

Club
Peñarol
Primera División Uruguaya Winner: 2009–10

UANL
Liga MX: Apertura 2015

International
Uruguay
FIFA World Cup Fourth-place: 2010
Copa América Winner: 2011

References

External links
 
 

1982 births
Living people
Footballers from Paysandú
Uruguayan footballers
Association football midfielders
C.A. Bella Vista players
Peñarol players
C.F. Monterrey players
San Luis F.C. players
Tigres UANL footballers
Danubio F.C. players
Botafogo de Futebol e Regatas players
Club Tijuana footballers
Palermo F.C. players
Chicago Fire FC players
Atlético Morelia players
Atlas F.C. footballers
Chiapas F.C. footballers
C.D. Veracruz footballers
Racing Club de Avellaneda footballers
Club Libertad footballers
Deportivo Municipal footballers
Correcaminos UAT footballers
Sud América players
Argentine Primera División players
Uruguayan Primera División players
Uruguayan Segunda División players
Serie A players
Liga MX players
Ascenso MX players
Campeonato Brasileiro Série A players
Major League Soccer players
Designated Players (MLS)
Paraguayan Primera División players
Peruvian Primera División players
Primera División de Ascenso players
Olympic footballers of Uruguay
Uruguay international footballers
2010 FIFA World Cup players
2011 Copa América players
Footballers at the 2012 Summer Olympics
2013 FIFA Confederations Cup players
2014 FIFA World Cup players
2015 Copa América players
Copa América Centenario players
Copa América-winning players
Uruguayan expatriate footballers
Uruguayan expatriate sportspeople in Mexico
Uruguayan expatriate sportspeople in Brazil
Uruguayan expatriate sportspeople in Italy
Uruguayan expatriate sportspeople in the United States
Uruguayan expatriate sportspeople in Argentina
Uruguayan expatriate sportspeople in Paraguay
Uruguayan expatriate sportspeople in Peru
Uruguayan expatriate sportspeople in Guatemala
Expatriate footballers in Mexico
Expatriate footballers in Brazil
Expatriate footballers in Italy
Expatriate soccer players in the United States
Expatriate footballers in Argentina
Expatriate footballers in Paraguay
Expatriate footballers in Peru
Expatriate footballers in Guatemala
Naturalized citizens of Mexico